Kamil Brabenec (born 4 February 1951) is a retired Czech professional basketball player and coach. At 6'4" (1.93 m) tall, he was a small forward. He was voted to the Czechoslovakian 20th Century Team.

Playing career

Club career
During his club career, Brabenec was a FIBA European Selection, in 1977 and 1978. He won 6 Czechoslovakian League championships, in the years 1976, 1977, 1978, 1986, 1987, and 1988. He was also the league's second all-time scorer, with 10,726 points scored.

National team career
Brabenec helped to lead the senior Czechoslovakia national team to a EuroBasket silver medal, at the 1985 EuroBasket, as well as to two EuroBasket bronze medals, in 1977, and 1981. He was also the leading scorer of the 1978 FIBA World Championship, with a scoring average of 26.9 points per game.

Coaching career
After his playing career, Brabenec worked as a basketball coach.

See also
List of the best Czech basketball players of the 20th century
Czechoslovak Basketball League career stats leaders

References

External links
 FIBA.com Profile
 Fibaeurope.com Profile
 Sports-reference.com Profile
 Kamil Brabenec, the Czech scoring machine

1951 births
Living people
Basketball players at the 1972 Summer Olympics
Basketball players at the 1976 Summer Olympics
Basketball players at the 1980 Summer Olympics
Czech basketball coaches
Czechoslovak basketball coaches
Czech men's basketball players
Czechoslovak men's basketball players
1974 FIBA World Championship players
1978 FIBA World Championship players
Olympic basketball players of Czechoslovakia
Shooting guards
Small forwards
People from Znojmo
MBK Handlová players
Sportspeople from the South Moravian Region
BC Brno players